is a shop simulator game released by Bandai in 2006 for the Nintendo DS and features characters from the Tamagotchi media series. It was subsequently followed by Tamagotchi Connection: Corner Shop 2, released later that same year. The game tasks the player with choosing one of three Tamagotchi (Mametchi, Memetchi or Kuchipatchi) to run a store with, playing  different store-dependent mini-games in order serve customers.

Reception
Tamagotchi Connection: Corner Shop was the 8th best-selling game of 2005 in Japan, selling 770,391 copies. To date, the game has sold 1.12 million copies in the region.

See also
Tamagotchi
Tamagotchi Connection: Corner Shop 2
Tamagotchi Connection: Corner Shop 3

References

External links
Official website 
Tamagotchi Connection: Corner Shop at IGN

2005 video games
Bandai Namco games
Nintendo DS games
Nintendo DS-only games
Tamagotchi video games
Video games based on toys
Video games developed in Japan
Multiplayer and single-player video games
NanaOn-Sha games